The Vow is a 2012 American romantic drama film directed by Michael Sucsy and written by Abby Kohn, Marc Silverstein, and Jason Katims, inspired by the true story of Kim and Krickitt Carpenter. The film stars Rachel McAdams and Channing Tatum as Paige and Leo Collins, with Sam Neill, Scott Speedman, Jessica Lange and Jessica McNamee in supporting roles. As of 2013, The Vow was the eighth highest-grossing romantic drama film produced since 1980. This was Spyglass Entertainment's last film before the company's closure in 2012, and its revival in 2019.

Plot
Paige Collins and her husband Leo come out of a movie theater. On their way home, at a stop sign, Paige unbuckles her seatbelt to lean over and kiss Leo. At that very moment, a truck rams their car from behind and Paige crashes through the windshield. Both of them are rushed to the emergency room, and as Leo, in a voice-over, talks about how "moments of impact help in finding who we are" the movie cuts to how Paige and Leo first met. The scenes of how they courted, became engaged and married at the Art Institute of Chicago and share a kiss under the Cloud Gate are interwoven with the present.

Paige is put into an induced coma and when she regains consciousness, she thinks Leo is her doctor, having lost all memories of the past few years. When her wealthy parents, Bill and Rita Thornton, learn about this, they visit her. This is the first time that Leo meets them, and they do not appreciate Leo taking their daughter, and not being informed. Paige does not understand why he would not have met her parents, after having been married to her. She finds it even stranger that he did not know why either. Nor did she understand why she left law school, broke her engagement with her previous fiancé, Jeremy, and why she has not been in touch with her family and friends. Her parents insist on taking her home with them and Paige agrees, thinking she might have married Leo for some mutual benefit. She seeks evidence of the marriage. Just as she is about to leave, Leo comes running to play her a voice message in which she sounds very happy and romantic. Paige decides to go back with Leo, hoping it will help her regain her lost memory. Paige is welcomed home with a surprise party by her friends, but as she is not able to remember any of them, she finds it overwhelming and is extremely confused.

The next day Paige ventures out to her regular café, but does not remember having been there and loses her way back. She calls her mother because she does not know or remember Leo's number. That evening Leo and Paige are invited for dinner by her parents. At the dinner and in the bar later, Leo does not fit in with her family and friends. He persists in his attempts to help her regain her lost memory, but Paige is more driven to learn why she left law school and broke her engagement to Jeremy. During the course of one encounter with Jeremy, she kisses him. Her doctor advises her to fill the holes in her memory rather than be afraid of her past. With her sister Gwen's wedding approaching, Paige decides to stay with her parents until the wedding. Though Leo asks her out on a date and spends a night with her, the relationship is further strained when Paige's dad attempts to persuade Leo to divorce his daughter, and by Leo punching Jeremy for talking about chances to bed his wife.

Paige rejoins law school and Leo signs divorce papers. At a store, she meets her old friend Diane who, unaware of her amnesia, apologizes for having had a relationship with Paige's dad, thus alerting Paige as to why she had left her family. When she confronts her mother about this, Rita tells her that she decided to stay with Bill for all the things he had done right instead of leaving him for one wrong act. Paige then asks Leo why he never told her, and he replies he wanted to earn her love instead of driving her away from her parents. Paige, while in class, starts sketching; thus depicting why she first left law school. Despite her father's misgivings about quitting law school, she reassures him that she will always be his daughter no matter what. She continues her interest in art, eventually returning to sculpting and drawing. Though Jeremy confesses he broke up with his present girlfriend, hoping to be back with her, she turns him down stating she needs to know what life would be like without him.

As seasons change, Leo discusses his philosophy about "Moments of impact". "A moment of impact whose potential for change has ripple effects far beyond what we can predict. Sending some particles crashing together, making them closer than before. While sending others, spinning off into great adventures, landing where you never thought you'd find them". Back in her room, Paige finds the menu card on which she had written her wedding vows and is deeply moved. The movie ends with Paige finding Leo at their regular Café Mnemonic and suggesting they go to their backup Cuban restaurant that she knew of because she had been asking her friend about the relationship. Leo then suggests to trying out a new place that they've never been to, which Paige agrees to and film ends as they walk away from the scene.

Cast

Production
Rachel McAdams and Channing Tatum's casting was announced by Variety in June 2010. Filming took place from August until November 2010 in Toronto and Chicago.

Background
The Vow is loosely based on the actual relationship of Kim and Krickitt Carpenter, who wrote a book about their marriage, also known as The Vow. Ten weeks after their wedding on September 18, 1993, the couple was involved in a serious car accident. Krickitt suffered a brain trauma, which erased all memories of her romance with Kim as well as their marriage. Kim was still deeply in love with his wife, although she viewed him as a stranger after the accident. In 2018, however, he admitted to having an affair and they divorced.

The film was developed as early as 1998, when Spyglass Entertainment was first set up. Stephen Herek was attached to direct at first.

Music

The soundtrack was released on February 7, 2012, through Rhino Records. The film score, written and composed by Rachel Portman and Michael Brook, was released digitally on a separate album on February 7, 2012, through Madison Gate Records.

Track listing

The digital version of the soundtrack also contains "England" by The National.

Release

Critical response
Review aggregation website Rotten Tomatoes gives the film an approval rating of 31% based on 134 reviews and an average rating of 4.95/10. The site's consensus reads, "Channing Tatum and Rachel McAdams do their best with what they're given, but The Vow is too shallow and familiar to satisfy the discriminating date-night filmgoer." On Metacritic, which assigns a weighted mean rating to reviews, the film received an average score of 43 out of 100 based on 28 critics, which indicates "mixed or average reviews".

Emma Dibdin from Total Film gave the film a three stars rating out of five, commenting, "there's an essential sweetness at work here, thanks partly to McAdams and partly to an unusually chaste love story that ultimately keeps melodrama at bay." Empire critic Helen O'Hara gave the film a three stars rating out of five, also. She found McAdams "excellent" and Tatum "surprisingly heartbreaking" and concluded, "The few weaknesses in the plot can be overlooked as The Vow makes for a wonderful – if a bit teary – romance that is brilliantly acted." The Washington Posts Stephanie Merry wrote, "It's a shame things are so black and white, because the movie has more promise – and more laughs – than trailers suggest". She added "Tatum, while a bit deficient in the dramatic acting department, delivers some memorable quips. He and McAdams also have chemistry."

Giving the film a 2.5 stars out of 4, Roger Ebert from the Chicago Sun-Times found it "pleasant enough as a date movie, but that's all." USA Today wrote, "It may appeal to the most rabid fans of tearjerk romances like The Notebook, but it's a hard-to-swallow, maudlin tale." Betsy Sharkey, film critic from the Los Angeles Times wrote, "Despite the sweet story, this is a movie that leaves you wanting more. To care more, to cry more, to love more." ReelViews' James Berardinelli was very negative about the film. He wrote, "with its would-be crowd-pleasing contrivances and rote adherence to formula, [this film] offers almost no redeeming characteristics. [...] This is for young women what Transformers is for young men. He concluded describing the film as a "heartless, soulless product".

Box office
The Vow debuted at #1 in its opening weekend, with $15.4 million on opening day and $41.2 million over the weekend. On the Valentine's Day the film grossed $11.6 million, breaking Hitchs record $7.5 million for the highest-grossing mid-week Valentine's Day. It also earned around $9.7 million internationally that weekend.

On the weekend lasting from February 24–26, The Vow became the first film of 2012 in North America to cross the $100 million mark, and the third film to cross the $100 million mark worldwide behind Underworld: Awakening and Journey 2: The Mysterious Island. The film grossed $125 million in North America and $71.1 million in other countries for a worldwide total of $196.1 million. It is the eighth highest-grossing romantic drama film since 1980. Documents from the Sony Pictures hack revealed the film turned a profit of $52 million.

Accolades

Home media 
The DVD and Blu-ray Disc were released on May 8, 2012.

See also 
 Mithya

References

External links
 
 
 
 
 

2012 films
2012 biographical drama films
2012 romantic drama films
American biographical drama films
American romantic drama films
2010s English-language films
Adultery in films
Drama films based on actual events
Films about amnesia
Films about road accidents and incidents
Films about the visual arts
Films based on non-fiction books
Films set in Chicago
Films shot in Chicago
Films shot in Toronto
Screen Gems films
Spyglass Entertainment films
Films directed by Michael Sucsy
Films produced by Roger Birnbaum
Films scored by Rachel Portman
Films scored by Michael Brook
2010s American films
Films about disability